Petar Nikolov Petrov (born 17 February 1955 in Svishtov, Veliko Tarnovo) is a retired Bulgarian sprinter who specialized in the 100 metres. His personal best time was 10.13 seconds, achieved at the 1980 Olympics. This is the Bulgarian record.

In 1973 he won two European Junior silver medals in the 100 and 200 metres.

He was 1976 Olympic 100 metres finalist, where he finished 8th.

He was twice European Athletics Cup semifinal winner in 1977, and 1979.

He went on to win three medals at the European Indoor Championships, a silver medal at the 1977 Summer Universiade.

He also won seven Balkan Games titles

He then made his 2nd Olympic final at the 1980 Olympics where he won the 100 metres bronze medal. In the latter race he finished behind Allan Wells and Silvio Leonard. Petrov also competed in the Olympic 200 metres, but was eliminated in the quarterfinal. He was also, together with Vladimir Ivanov, Ivaylo Karanyotov and Pavel Pavlov, a member of the Bulgarian 4x100 m relay team that finished sixth in the final.

He finished eighth in the 4 x 100 metres relay at the 1982 European Athletics Championships together with Karanyotov, Nikolay Markov and Ivan Tuparov.

On the domestic level Petrov won nine outdoor Bulgarian sprint titles and five indoor 60 metres titles.

Achievements

References
sports-reference

1955 births
Living people
Bulgarian male sprinters
Athletes (track and field) at the 1976 Summer Olympics
Athletes (track and field) at the 1980 Summer Olympics
Olympic athletes of Bulgaria
Olympic bronze medalists for Bulgaria
People from Veliko Tarnovo
Medalists at the 1980 Summer Olympics
Olympic bronze medalists in athletics (track and field)
Universiade medalists in athletics (track and field)
Universiade silver medalists for Bulgaria
Medalists at the 1977 Summer Universiade
Sportspeople from Veliko Tarnovo Province